Han Go-eun (born March 10, 1975) is a South Korean actress.

Career
Han Go-eun won the Super Elite Model Contest in 1995, and after several years of modeling, she began acting full-time in 1998. That year, she made her acting debut in the film City of the Rising Sun, but stayed in television in subsequent years.

Despite the popularity of her television dramas such as Bodyguard (2003), Han was criticized early in her career for poor acting, particularly for her voice articulation and pronunciation.

But she later earned praise for her roles in More Beautiful Than a Flower, Love and Ambition (2006), Capital Scandal (2007), and The Reputable Family (2010).

In 2011, she starred in Daughters of Bilitis Club, part of the single-episode anthology Drama Special. Named after the American lesbian rights group, it was public broadcaster KBS's first lesbian-themed drama and was a frank portrayal of three same-sex couples across multiple generations. But it was later pulled off the air due to public pressure.

Afterwards, Han played antagonists in Me Too, Flower! (2011), and Goddess of Fire (2013).

She also hosts Diet Master, a weekly program on cable that invites guests who have struggled to lose weight and provides help from health experts.

In 2018, she star in Same Bed, Different Dreams 2: You Are My Destiny, a reality show which have received favourable feedback and become well known in some international countries. 

In 2019, she star in Miss Korea/I Miss Korea, a cook stay variety program which showed her traveling to different homes around the world and showcase her cooking skills.

Personal life
She lived in the US from middle school until college, which allowed her to learn English. 

Han's sister Seong-won was also a model. 

From 2001 to 2003, Han had a highly publicized relationship with Park Joon-hyung, singer and member of the boy band g.o.d.

She married a corporate employee, Shin Yeong-soo, on August 30, 2015.

Filmography

Television series
 Never Give Up (Netflix, 2022)
Undercover (JTBC, 2021)
Love Alert (MBN, 2018) 
Should We Kiss First (SBS, 2018)
Miss Mamma Mia (KBS, 2015)
A Little Love Never Hurts (MBC, 2013)
Goddess of Fire (MBC, 2013)
Suspicious Family (MBN, 2012)
Me Too, Flower! (MBC, 2011)
Drama Special "Daughters of Bilitis Club" (KBS2, 2011)
Chuno The Slave Hunters 2010
A Man Called God (MBC, 2010)
The Reputable Family (KBS1, 2010)
Can Anyone Love (SBS, 2009)
Formidable Rivals (KBS2, 2008) (cameo, ep 16)
Woman of Matchless Beauty, Park Jung-geum (MBC, 2008)
Capital Scandal (KBS2, 2007)
Love and Ambition (SBS, 2006)
Lawyers (MBC, 2005)
Spring Day (SBS, 2005)
Jang Gil-san (SBS, 2004)
More Beautiful Than a Flower (KBS2, 2004)
Bodyguard (KBS2, 2003)
That Woman Catches People (SBS, 2002)
Like Father Unlike Son (KBS, 2001)
Medical Center (SBS, 2000)
Money.com (SBS, 2000)
Love Story "Lost Baggage" (SBS, 1999)
Sweet Bride (SBS, 1999)
Happy Together (SBS, 1999)
LA Arirang (SBS, 1995)

Film
The Black Hand (2015)
City of Damnation (2009)
City of the Rising Sun (1998)

Variety show
 Legendary Actors (KBS2, 2021 , Chuseok special program) 
Miss Korea (2019)
Same Bed, Different Dreams 2: You Are My Destiny (2018)
Diet Master (StoryOn, 2013)
Law of the Jungle W (SBS, 2012) 
Diet Wars 6 (StoryOn, 2012)
Entertainment Weekly (KBS2, 2001) 
Section TV (MBC, 1999)

Music video
Beige - "I Can't Drink" (2011)
Park Hye-kyung - "New Boyfriend" (2010)
Cho Eun - "Sad Love Song" (2004)
MC the Max - "Poem of Love" (2003)
Lee Soo-young - "Never Again" (2001)

Awards
2007 KBS Drama Awards: Best Supporting Actress (Capital Scandal)
2003 KBS Drama Awards: Popularity Award (Bodyguard)
2002 SBS Drama Awards: Popularity Award (That Woman Catches People)
2001 KBS Drama Awards: Popularity Award, Photogenic Award (Like Father Unlike Son)

References

External links
Han Go-eun at Mada Entertainment 

South Korean television actresses
South Korean film actresses
South Korean female models
IHQ (company) artists
American people of South Korean descent
Living people
1976 births
Models from Seoul